Carposina dominicae is a moth in the Carposinidae family. It was described by Davis in 1969. It is found on Dominica.

References

Natural History Museum Lepidoptera generic names catalog

Carposinidae
Moths described in 1969